The 2018 Senior Bowl was an all-star college football exhibition game featuring players from the 2017 NCAA Division I FBS football season, and prospects for the 2018 draft of the professional National Football League (NFL). The game was the last of the 2017–18 bowl games and the final game of the 2017 FBS football season. It was sponsored by Reese's Peanut Butter Cups and was officially known as the Reese's Senior Bowl.
 
The game was played on January 27, 2018, at 1:30 p.m. CST, at Ladd–Peebles Stadium in Mobile, Alabama, between "North" and "South" teams; coverage of the event was provided by NFL Network.

Bowl organizers announced that, for the first time, RFID devices would be used to track players and footballs during practices and the game. The maker of the RFID devices, Zebra Sports Solutions, was also announced as a corporate sponsor of the game.

Rosters
In late December 2017, bowl organizers announced that Heisman Trophy winner Baker Mayfield of Oklahoma would appear in the game; the most recent Heisman Trophy winner to play in the Senior Bowl was Tim Tebow in the 2010 game. Full rosters were announced on January 18, 2018. The head coaches were Vance Joseph of the Denver Broncos and Bill O' Brien of the Houston Texans, for the North and South teams, respectively.

North team

Source:
 Luke Falk switched his uniform number from 4 to 3 in honor of Tyler Hilinski.

South team

Source:

Game summary

Scoring summary

Source:
Note: special playing rules detailed here.
 Senior Bowl rules require teams to attempt 2-point conversions during the 2nd quarter.

Statistics

Source:

References

Further reading

External links
 2018 Reese's Senior Bowl Full Game Replay via YouTube

Senior Bowl
Senior Bowl
January 2018 sports events in the United States
Senior Bowl